The House of Caracciolo is a prominent aristocratic family from the city of Naples. The Caracciolos are considered one of the most important families in the history of the Kingdom of Naples, and also held relevant posts in the Spanish Empire.

History 
According to a tradition based on the writings of Agatharchides of Cnidos and Sergius the Confessor, the family is of Greek descent, originating from the Byzantine nobility. The first documented mention of the family date back to the 10th century with the progenitor Teodoro Caracciolo, who was reported in ancient documents as Theodorus Caracziolus, of which only archival information is available; he was buried together with his wife Urania in the Cathedral of the Assumption of Mary in Naples. He is reported to have died on 20 March 976, the date of a document in which it is learned that in this period his daughter Theodonanda made a donation to the Monastery of Saints Sergius and Bacchus in Naples.

At the time of the Duchy of Naples, the family enjoyed nobility during the reign of the Sergian dynasty, benefiting from special privileges granted by Sergius VII of Naples. The family then divided into numerous lines, including the ancient lines of the likes of Caracciolo Canella, Caracciolo Ugot, Caracciolo Viola, and Caracciolo Ciccola, then into the lines of the likes of the del Sole, Bianchi, Rossi, and Pisquizi. Specifically, Riccardo Caracciolo, son of Landolfo, who lived in the early 12th century, was the progenitor of the Caracciolo Rossi. Caracciolo Pisquizi Filippo, also son of Landolfo, was the progenitor of the branch of the Caracciolo del Sole and that of the Caracciolo di Pisciotta.

In 1869, the family was enrolled in the Libro d'Oro, the Golden Book of the Italian nobility. Thanks to the great importance of the Caracciolo family, most of the most important events of the Kingdom of Naples had various members of the family as protagonists, sometimes even on opposing fronts.

Notable members 
 Niccolo d'Ardia Caracciolo (1941–1989), painter from a branch in Ireland since the 20th century
 Nicola Caracciolo (1931–2020), 10th Prince of Castagneto, 5th Duke di Melito, journalist, and historian
 Marella Caracciolo (1927–2019), Princess of Castagneto, art collector, designer, and widow of Gianni Agnelli
 Carlo Caracciolo (1925–2008), 9th Prince of Castagneto, 4th Duke of Melito, newspaper publisher, and founder of Gruppo Editoriale L'Espresso
 Franco Caracciolo (1920–1999), actor and conductor
 Filippo Caracciolo (1903–1965), 8th Prince of Castagneto, 3rd Duke di Melito
 Rudolf Caracciola (1901–1959), racing driver from a branch in Germany since the 17th century
 Giuseppe Caracciolo (1892–1975), cinematographer
 Miriam Caracciolo di Melito (1888–1966), American socialite and wife of Mario Caracciolo di Melito
 Mario Caracciolo di Melito (1883–1958), Italian cavalry officer and American actor known as Mario Carillo
 Filippo Giudice Caracciolo (1785–1844), Archbishop of Naples (1833–1844)
 Tommaso Caracciolo (1687–1689), Bishop of Gerace  
 Carmine Nicolao Caracciolo (1671–1726), Viceroy of the Spanish Colony of Peru from a branch in Spain since the 16th century
 Tommaso Caracciolo (1636–1637), Archbishop of Taranto
 Gerolamo Caracciolo (1617–1682), Marqués de Torrecuso, Governor of Navarre, and soldier from a branch in Spain since the 16th century
 Tommaso Caracciolo, Count of Roccarainola (1572–1631), Spanish field marshal
 Pasquale Caracciolo (1566–1608), writer and horsemanship expert
 Tommaso Caracciolo (1478–1546), Archbishop of Capua (1536–1546), Bishop of Trivento (1502–1540), and Bishop of Capaccio (1523–1531)
 Marino Caracciolo (1468–1538), cardinal and diplomat
 Giovanni Caracciolo (c. 1372–1432), minister of the Kingdom of Naples and favourite of Queen Joanna II who was often called Sergianni
 Riccardo Caracciolo (c. 1320–1395), one of two rival Grand Masters of the Knights Hospitaller

References

Bibliography

External links 
 Nobili napoletani (in Italian)

 
Italian noble families
Neapolitan nobility